Al-Ṭayyib Abūʾl-Qāsim ibn Al-Manṣūr was, according to the Tayyibi Isma'ili-Musta'li sect of Isma'ilism, the twenty-first Imam and the last Caliph of the Fatimid Caliphate. Abu Al-Qasim was the son of the twentieth Fatimid Imam, Al-Amir bi-Ahkami'l-Lah, who ruled Egypt from 1101 to 1130. He was born in Cairo on Sunday, March 16, 1130 (4th Rabi' al-thani, 524 AH) and was 2 years 7 months old when his father, Al-Amir, was assassinated in the night of Thursday, October 15, 1132 (4th Dhu al-Qi'dah, 526 AH). Tayyib was reported to be about two years old at the time of al-Amir's assassination. Al-Hafiz was appointed representative Caliph on behalf of Imam Al-Tayyib. Later Al-Hafiz declared himself as Imam and Caliph in 528 AH/1134 AD, and Al-Tayyib was believed by Taiyabis to be taken into hiding.

At-Tayyib and Muhammad ibn Al-Hasan are descendants of the Islamic Prophet Muhammad who are considered by different groups of Shi'ites (respectively Tayyibi Isma'ilis and Twelvers) to be Occulted Imams and Mahdis.

Birth and infancy

As per chronicle of Ibn al-Muyassar (d. 677): "In Rabi al-Awwal (of 524 AH) ... Abul-Qasim al-Tayyib was born to al-Amir; ... Cairo was decorated ... New suits of clothes were issued to the troops ... at the 'aqiqa ceremony ... in presence of Al-Amir ... the child was brought in, and Chief Qadi Ibn al- Muyassar was given the honour of holding it ... the palace was filled with fruits and other sweets ..."

It is said that the guardian of Tayyib was Ibn Madyan, who have hidden him in Masjidur-Raḥmah ("Mosque of the Mercy"). The infant son of Al-Amir was supposed to carry in a basket of reeds by Abu Turab in which were vegetables ("dishes of cooked leeks and onions and carrots"), and the baby wrapped in "swaddling clothes was on the bottom with the food above him, and he brought him to the cemetery and the wet nurse suckled him in this mosque, and he concealed the matter from Al-Hafiz until the baby grew up and began to be called Kufayfa, "little basket."" According to Ṭayyibī Musta'lid tradition, before Ṭayyib went into the Occultation, his father Al-Amir had instructed Queen al-Hurrah Arwa bint Ahmad in Yemen to anoint a vicegerent after the seclusion, the Da'i al-Mutlaq, who as the Imam's vicegerent has full authority to govern the community in all matters both spiritual and temporal.

Hafizi Isma'ilis
The Hafizi Musta'li Isma'ilis continued to accept Al-Hafiz and his successors — Az-Zafir, Al-Faiz, Al-Adid, Daud Al-Hamid-lil-lah, d. 1207 AD, died in prison under the Ayyubid dynasty, and finally Sulayman Badruddin, d. 1248 AD without issue, also died in prison under the Ayyubid dynasty, the last Imam of the Hafizi Musta'li Ismailis — as Fatimid Imam of Egypt between 1130-1248 AD instead of aṭ-Ṭayyib Abī l-Qāṣim. After the end of their rule by Saladin they went extinct, while the followers of Aṭ-Ṭayyib Abī Al-Qāṣim continued in Yemen and the Indian subcontinent. Hafizi followers report that the Zurayids and the Hamdanids (Yemen) were the subsequent heads of the Hafizi party in Yemen.

Tayyibis in Yemen

There was a sijill (royal order) (524 AH) of al-Amir to Yemen (testimony of al- Khattab available) announcing birth of the heir, al-Tayyib, in the court of al-Mallika al-Sayyida (Arwa al-Sulayhi) by 'Egyptian envoy' Muhammad b. Haydara. On the occasion of the commemoration of the murdered Imam, the envoy said: "...appointed by his (Amir) nass...al-Imam al-Tayyib...it is in vein that mislead people think it will diminish by your (Amir) death.." Later in 526 AH, Abd al-Majid in his official correspondence to Queen Arwa al-Sulayhi declared himself caliph in place of regent. According to this Queen al-Hurrah Arwa al-Sulayhi found it a betrayal as per the earlier sijill of Imam al Amir and of Abd al Majid himself declaring 'Abd al Majid a Wali of the Imam'.

As per 'Uyun al Akhbar', "She (Queen Arwa al-Sulayhi) never ceased remain faithful to Al-Tayyib. In the preamble of the will, it enumerated all the Imams; the list ends with al-Tayyib. The text gives a detailed description of the Queen's jewellery brought for the inspection, all the jewellery is bequeathed, as a qurban, to the Imam al-Tayyib, Al-Ahmad.. al-Sulayhi is appointed as executor; his duty is to deliver the jewels, after the Queen's death, ..at the Gate of the Friend of God (bab-ul- wali-ul-llah), ..to the person that will be appointed by the order of the Imam (Tayyib) to receive them...". She anointed Da'i al-Mutlaq / vicegerent on behalf of Imam Tayyib. The Dai al-Mutlaq would have full authority to govern the community in all matters both spiritual and temporal, and Dai Zoeb bin musa was designated first for the post with Ibrahim as his assistant who has taken over next Dai after the death of Zoeb.

Da'is
The line of the Da'is continued until the 24th Dai Yusuf Najmuddin ibn Sulaiman in Yemen. On behalf of the Da'i of Yemen, there were  Wali ("representative" or "caretaker") of the Fatimid Dawat appointed in India. Moulai Abadullah (covered North India) and Moulai Nuruddin (covered South India) were the first two to influence in India and initiate the Ismaili Tayyibi Faith. Syedi Fakhruddin, son of  Vazir Tarmal of King Sidhraj of Gujrat (1094-1134AD), who accepted the Islamic faith, was prominent, covered Rajasthan. His mausoleum is in Galiakot and is visited by all the people in the area irrespective of their caste.

In 1592, the Taiyabi broke into two factions in a dispute over who should become the twenty-seventh Da'i: Dawood Bin Qutubshah or Sulayman bin Hassan. The followers of the former, primarily in India, became the Dawoodi Bohra, the latter the Sulaymani of Yemen. In 1637, the Alavi Bohra split from the Dawoodi bohra community.

Due to persecution by the local ruler in Yemen, the Dawat then shifted to India under the 25th Da'i Jalal Shamshuddin. This is continued till date, and at present, the largest Taiyabi-descended faction is the Dawoodi Bohra Da'wa. The other factions of Sulaimani Bohra are headed by their 52nd Da'i Al-Fakhri Abdullah, and the Alavi Bohra are headed by their 45th Da'i Haatim Zakiyuddin.

See also
 List of Dai of Dawoodi Bohra
 List of Ismaili Imams
 Family tree linking prophets to Imams

References

Further reading

External links
 List of Syednas (according to Dawoodi Bohras)
 alavibohra.org

Egyptian Ismailis
Musta'li imams
1130 births
Year of death unknown
12th-century Arabs
12th-century Ismailis